Snakov is a village and municipality in Bardejov District in the Prešov Region of north-east Slovakia.

History
In historical records the village was first mentioned in 1543

Geography
The municipality lies at an altitude of 450 metres and covers an area of 12.139 km².
It has a population of about 655 people.

In the valley where the source Topľa in its upper reaches, where the main valley ends and forks in the lower valley, near the Polish border, lies the village of Snakov. This village is located in the westernmost part of the Low Beskid, under their principal back, at an altitude of 450 meters. It is located 18 kilometers west of the town Bardejov beside the main road that leads to the Stará Ľubovňa.

Snakov is located in the district of Bardejov in the Presov region. The village is adjacent to a county in the east, the north and northeast leading state border with Poland and the south and southwest of the village Malcov. Through the village a relatively small stream flows Vesna, which rises near the border with Poland. Vesna is at the crossroads (the "Mlynisko") flows into the river Topľa. Geographical area is about 1,460 hectares. It stretched the length of two kilometers.

External links
 
 
http://www.statistics.sk/mosmis/eng/run.html
http://www.snakov.ocu.sk/sk/index.php?ids=6

Villages and municipalities in Bardejov District
Šariš